Damir Bičanić (born 29 July 1985) is a Croatian handball player, playing for RK Zagreb and the Croatian national team.

He competed for the Croatian national team at the 2012 Summer Olympics in London.

Honours
RK Zagreb
Croatian Premier League: 2006–07, 2007–08, 2017-2018, 2018-2019
Croatian Cup: 2007, 2008, 2018, 2019

CB Ademar León
Copa ASOBAL: 2009

Chambéry
Trophée des champions: 2013

References

External links
EHF profile

1985 births
Living people
Sportspeople from Vukovar
Croatian male handball players
Olympic handball players of Croatia
Handball players at the 2012 Summer Olympics
Olympic bronze medalists for Croatia
Olympic medalists in handball
Medalists at the 2012 Summer Olympics
Liga ASOBAL players
CB Ademar León players
RK Zagreb players
Mediterranean Games silver medalists for Croatia
Mediterranean Games medalists in handball
Expatriate handball players
Croatian expatriate sportspeople in France
Croatian expatriate sportspeople in Spain
Competitors at the 2005 Mediterranean Games